Abdulnasser Gharem (born 4 June 1973) is a Saudi Arabian artist and also a lieutenant colonel in the Saudi Arabian army.  In April 2011, his installation Message/Messenger sold for a world record price at auction in Dubai.

Gharem's work is in the collections of the British Museum, the Victoria & Albert Museum, Los Angeles County Museum of Art and the Saudi Arabian Ministry of Culture and Information,  His artwork is characterized by innovative use of materials, including rubber stamps, a collapsed bridge, and an invasive tree.

Early life and education
Gharem was born in Khamis Mushait. In 1992 Gharem graduated from the King Abdulaziz Academy before attending The Leader Institute in Riyadh. He has had no formal art training. In 2003 Gharem studied at the Al-Meftaha Arts Village in Abha.

Career
In 2004 Gharem and the Al-Meftaha artists staged a group exhibition, Shattah. in Saudi Arabia. Since then Gharem has exhibited in Europe, the Persian Gulf and the United States, including at Martin Gropius-Bau and at the Venice Biennial, Sharjah Biennial and Berlin Biennale.

His first monograph ‘Abdulnasser Gharem: Art of Survival’ was published in London in October 2011.

In 2014 Gharem lives and works in Riyadh. He is the co-founder of the arts initiative Edge of Arabia. Gharem donated the proceeds of his sale to Edge of Arabia to foster art education in his native country.

Selected group shows

2004 - 2009 
 Shattah – Atelier Gallery, Jeddah (27 Apr -14 May 2004)
 Son of Aseer – Al-Meftaha Arts Village, Abha (10 Oct-30 Oct 2006)
 Still Life: Art, Ecology and the Politics of Change – Sharjah Biennial 8 (4 Apr-4 Jun 2007)
 Edge of Arabia London: Contemporary Art from Saudi Arabia – SOAS Brunei Gallery, University of London (16 Oct-13 Dec 2008)
 The 28th Annual Exhibition – Gulf Fine Arts Society, Sharjah (March 2009)
 Edge of Arabia Venice – Palazzo Contarini Polignac, 53rd Venice Biennale (5 Jun-2 Aug 2009)

2010 
 Edge of Arabia Istanbul: TRANSiTION – Sanat Limani, Antrepo 5 (10 Nov-10 Dec)
 Opening the Doors: Collecting Middle Eastern Art, Abu Dhabi Art (3 Nov-7 Nov)
 CAVE: Contemporary Arab Video Encounter – Maraya Arts Centre, Sharjah (2 Nov-11 Dec)
 Emerging Asian Artists, Gwangju Biennale (1 Sep-5 Sep)
 Edge of Arabia Berlin: Grey Borders/Grey Frontiers – Soho House, Berlin (9 Jun-18 Jul)
 Fuck Ups, Fables and Fiascos – Galerie Caprice Horn, Berlin (8 Jun-17 Sep)
 Edge of Arabia World Tour Launch – Global Competitiveness Forum, Riyadh (23 Jan-26 Jan)
 Taswir: Pictorial Mappings of Islam and Modernity – Martin Gropius-Bau, Berlin (5 Nov ((2009)) -18 Jan)

2011 
 Political Patterns – ifa-Galerie, Berlin (8 Jul-3 Oct)
 The Future of a Promise: Contemporary Art from the Arab World – Magazzini del Sale, 54th Venice Biennale (1 Jun-27 Nov)
 The Bravery of Being Out of Range – Athr Gallery, Jeddah (24 May-18 Jun)
 The New Middle East – Willem Baars Projects, Amsterdam (31 May-30 July)
 Edge of Arabia Dubai: TERMINAL – Building 9, Gate Village, Dubai International Financial Centre, Dubai (14 Mar-15 Apr)
 Uppers & Downers – Traffic, Dubai (9 Feb-5 Mar)
 Nujoom: Constellations of Arab Art from The Farjam Collection – The Farjam Collection @ DIFC, Dubai (1 Nov ((2010)) - Mar 2011)
 I Don’t Need Your Money Honey All I Need is Love – Traffic, Dubai (5 Jan –27 Jan)

2012 
 Arab Express: The Latest Art From the Arab World - Mori Art Museum, Tokyo, Japan (16 Jun - 28 Oct) 
 Porta dell'Oriente - Roma Contemporary, Italy (25-27 May)
 Bending History - Katara Galleries, Katara Cultural Village, Doha, Qatar (8 Mar - 8 April)
 Hajj, Journey to the Heart of Islam – British Museum, London (26 Jan-15 Apr)
 Edge of Arabia –  Al Furusia Marina, Jeddah (20 Jan-26 Feb)
 Contemporary Istanbul - Turkey ( 22-25 Nov)
 Light from the Middle East: New Photography - Victoria & Albert Museum, London (13 Nov - 7 April 2013)
 La voce delle immagini - Palazzo Grassi - Venice, Italy (30 Aug- 13 Jan 2012)

Collections 

 The British Museum
 The Victoria and Albert Museum
 LACMA, Los Angeles County Museum of Art
 The Saudi Arabian Ministry of Culture and Information
 The Jameel Foundation
 Nadour Collection
 Greenbox Museum
 The Barjeel Art Foundation
 The Farook Collection
 The Farjam Collection
 Kamel Lazaar Foundation
 BASMOCA, Basma Alsulaiman Museum of Contemporary Art

Publications 

 Hemming, Henry. Abdulnasser Gharem: Art of Survival (London: Booth-Clibborn, 2011) 
 Jameel, Porter, King, Stapleton, Al-Turki. Edge of Arabia: Contemporary Art from Saudi Arabia (London: Booth Clibborn, 2012) 
 Porter, Venetia. Hajj, journey to the heart of Islam (London: Harvard University Press, 2012) 
 Lazaar, Lina and Downey, Anthony. The Future of a Promise (London: Ibraaz, 2011)

References

External links 

 Abdulnasser Gharem official website
 Edge of Arabia Official Website
 EOA.Projects Official Website
 The Crossway Foundation Official Website

1973 births
Living people
Saudi Arabian artists